Bar Fight! is an American comedy film directed and written by Jim Mahoney. It follows former couple Allen (Luka Jones) and Nina (Melissa Fumero) who compete over who gets to stay at their local bar following their breakup. The film was released on November 11, 2022, on AMC+, on demand, and in theaters. It received generally negative reviews.

Plot

After splitting everything after their breakup, former couple Nina and Allen fight over who will keep their favorite local bar.

Cast

Luka Jones as Allen
Melissa Fumero as Nina
Rachel Bloom as Chelsea

Release
Bar Fight! was released on AMC+, on demand, and in theaters on November 11, 2022.

Reception

References

External links

2022 comedy films
2022 directorial debut films
American comedy films